Bassian may refer to:

 Saint Bassian (c. 320 – c. 409), Italian saint
 Bassian thrush, a bird of Australia and Tasmania
 Bassian ecoregion, a marine ecoregion
 Bassian Patrikeyev, Russian ecclesiastic and political figure and writer